John Alphonsus Everard (6 April 1881 – 1 October 1952) was an Australian rules footballer who played with Essendon in the Victorian Football League (VFL).

Notes

External links 

1881 births
1952 deaths
Australian rules footballers from Victoria (Australia)
Essendon Football Club players
Castlemaine Football Club players